Prachalit is a type of abugida script developed from the Nepalese scripts, which are a part of the family of Brahmic scripts descended from Brahmi script. It is used to write Nepal Bhasa, Sanskrit and Pali. Various publications are still published in this script including the Sikkim Herald the bulletin of the Sikkim government (Newari edition).

Consonants

Vowels

Symbols

Numerals

Unicode

Prachalit Nepal script was added to the Unicode Standard in June, 2016 with the release of version 9.0.

The Unicode block for Prachalit Nepal, called Newa, is U+11400–U+1147F:

See also
Nepalese scripts

References

Further reading
  Covers Prachalit, Ranjana and Bhujimol, development, current use, information about and drawings of character formation.

External links
 ScriptSource page on Prachalit Nepal script
 Fonts for Prachalit, Ranjana and Brahmi scripts
 Noto Sans Newa (GitHub) – a Noto font for Newa

Newar
Writing systems of Newar language